EDS or Eds may refer to:

Organisations
 Electronic Data Systems, a defunct American technology company

Education
 Episcopal Divinity School, an Episcopal Seminary in Cambridge, Massachusetts, US
 Evansville Day School, an independent college-prep school in Evansville, Indiana, US
 University of Ottawa English Debating Society, Canada

Politics
 Environmental Defence Society, a New Zealand environmental organisation
 European Democrat Students, a centre-right political students union
 European Democratic Party (Czech Republic), a Czech political party

Science and technology
 Electrodynamic suspension
 Elliptic divisibility sequence
 Energy-dispersive X-ray spectroscopy
 Effluent decontamination system

Chemistry
 Estradiol distearate
 Ethane dimethanesulfonate

Computing
 Electronic Document System, an early hypertext system
 Evolution Data Server, data management server in GNOME
 Extended Data Services, a data transmission standard
 Electronic Data Sheet, a file format, part of the CANopen protocol

Medicine
 Egg drop syndrome
 Ehlers-Danlos Society, a medical charity
 Ehlers–Danlos syndromes
 Episodic dyscontrol syndrome
 Excessive daytime sleepiness
 Exhalation delivery system

Military and space
 Electronic Data System, a command, control, and coordination system of the US Navy
 Earth Departure Stage, of the Ares V and Block II rockets
 Emergency Detection System, used on crewed rocket missions

Plant immunity
 The EDS1 family of plant immunity mediating proteins, the best studied examples of which are discussed at Arabidopsis thaliana § EDS1 family

Other uses
 Educational specialist (Ed.S.), an academic degree in the US
 Eds FF, a Swedish football club

See also

 
ED (disambiguation)